Philip Adrian Heath (born 24 November 1964) is an English former footballer who played in the Football League for Aldershot, Cardiff City, Oxford United and Stoke City.

Career
Heath was born in Longton, Stoke-on-Trent and came through the youth system at the Victoria Ground making his debut against Coventry City in the final home game of the 1982–83 season. He became a useful member of a struggling Stoke City side which was relegated with a record low points tally in 1984–85, Heath playing in 37 matches that season. He remained a regular under new manager Mick Mills in 1985–86 playing in 44 matches scoring four goals and at the end of the season Stoke turned down a bid of £150,000 from Everton for his services. He remained at Stoke and was highest league goalscorer in 1987–88 with eight goals.

At the end of the 1987–88 season he joined Oxford United for a fee of £100,000 where he spent two seasons and later had spells at Cardiff City and Aldershot before entering non-league football in 1992 with Aylesbury United. He later became player manager of Chipping Norton Town winning promotion for them from the Hellenic League Division One West to the Hellenic League Premier Division.

Career statistics
Source:

A.  The "Other" column constitutes appearances and goals in the Football League Trophy and Full Members Cup.

References

External links
 
 Interview with Phil Heath

1964 births
Living people
People from Longton, Staffordshire
English footballers
Association football wingers
Stoke City F.C. players
Oxford United F.C. players
Cardiff City F.C. players
Aldershot F.C. players
Aylesbury United F.C. players
Chipping Norton Town Swifts F.C. players
English Football League players
English football managers